Elsa Marie Rådbo, born 19 June 1946 in Stockholm, is a Swedish astronomer. In 1973, she started working as an astronomer at the Chalmers University of Technology in Gothenburg and is currently employed at the University of Gothenburg. She has published several popular science books in her subject area targeted at children, adolescents and adults.

In 2003, she received the "public educator of year" award for her dedicated work disseminating knowledge about the work methods and results of science."

Rådbo was a speaker in Sweden's radio P1 on 29 July 2005. In 2014 she was a participant on the Genikampen, a TV-program with bright people.

Awards 
 Rosén Prize 1998
 The Year's Educator 2003
 Gothenburg förtjänsttecken award, 2004
 Honorary doctorate at Chalmers University of Technology 2005
 Getinge's Culture and Science Prize, 2007
 Astronomical Youth Honorary Scholarship, 2014

Bibliography 

 Solsystemet, 1990 (2:a omarbetade upplagan 1993)
 Frågor & svar om rymden, 1990
 Är universum oändligt?, 1992
 Människan i rymden, 1992
 Universumboken, 1993, 1995, 1998, 2002, 2007, 2010
 Stjärnor, planeter och allt vad de heter, 1993
 Science for kids, 1996
 Rymdens gåtor, 1996, 1998, 200, 2004
 Från solgudar till svarta hål - en rymdhistoria (tillsammans med Lennart Eng), 1996 (2:a upplagan 1999)
 Runt i rymden - till alla frågvisa, 1998
 Fakta om solsystemet, 2001
 Ut i rymden - bland kometer, stjärnor och planeter, 2003
 Härifrån till oändligheten - fakta och funderingar om rymden, 2003
 Ögon känsliga för stjärnor, 2008
 Finns det liv i rymden?, 2012
 Stjärnhimlen: bortom gatlyktor och neonljus, 2015

References 

20th-century Swedish astronomers
1946 births
Academic staff of the Chalmers University of Technology
Academic staff of the University of Gothenburg
Living people
21st-century Swedish astronomers